Wendy Elizabeth Rule (born 31 October 1966) is an Australian musical artist. She was born in Sydney and later moved to Melbourne. She performs regularly and has toured the United States and Europe. She has been based in Santa Fe, New Mexico.

Early life
As a child, Rule was a keen singer from a young age and was described as having "a magical voice" which she would use to "burst into song beneath the blackberries in the backyard". Her tomboy tendencies were ended abruptly once she hit puberty and she was turned upon by her sister and mother, making her feel "repressed, unwanted and weird." At the age of 15 while in high school, she started to sing with rock bands, although it did not feel natural to her and she had moved onto jazz by the time she was in college. While she felt this was OK, it didn't feel like her passion. Once she reached the age of around 26, when her son was born, she had an epiphany whereby she was composing songs "about magic and witchcraft". She had always had an interest in fairies, tarot and the occult. After some soul searching, she came across a white magic guidebook in a bookshop, which she described as being "like BANG! This is what I'm meant to be doing!"

Career

Musical style
She released her first album in 1996, around four years after she had dedicated herself to performing and composing. Although her early roots were in jazz, she moved to the Goth genre.

Rule both composes and performs vocals on her albums.

Publicity
During the late 1990s, Rule's website was credited for generating interest in her music overseas, particularly in the United States and Europe, with a radio station Germany featuring her compact disc catalogue which was believed to have generated "a massive response". Foreign album orders around 1998 were seeing a 100% increase around every three months, with orders from America estimated at between $50 to $100 each week. A show that Rule performed in at the Continental Cafe in Prahran, Victoria had already sold half its tickets through her website prior to any advertising from the press. Her early website assisted in getting information out to a fan base at little to no cost, particularly as emails did not cost anything as opposed to posted letters.

Theology
She is a practising witch and her lyrics typically address pagan and mythological themes. She has publicly spoken about her belief in polytheism, and her lyrics have been used in Wiccan ritual. She happily discusses her Wicca faith openly, as she is tired of journalists "giving it a short shrift", noting that it is not a gimmick but her life.

Discography
Zero (1996) - Her first solo album, which took 9 months to record.
Live (1997) [Limited Release]
Deity (1998) - Established her "lush Gothic sound."
 A Journey to the Underworld. A musical play focussing on the Inanna mythology. Dibide into two sections, "Death" and "Life". Recorded at Melbourne's Universal Theatre and released on VHS video (1999). 
World Between Worlds (2000)
The Lotus Eaters (2003)
A Night of Jazz (2004)
collaboration with Gary Stadler: Deep within a Faerie Forest (2005, Sequoia Records)
The Wolf Sky (2006) - Produced in a style described as "wild, epic, dark and beautiful."
Meditations on the 4 Elements (2007)
Beneath The Below Is A River (2008)
Guided by Venus (2010)
Live At The Castle On The Hill (2012)
Black Snake (2014)
Vox Solfeggio (with Timothy van Diest) (2017)
Persephone (2019)

Compilations featuring tracks by Rule
The Best of Pagan Song (2004, Serpentine Music Productions)
with Gary Stadler: Celtic Lounge (2006, Sequoia Records)
with Gary Stadler: Celtic Lounge II (2007, Sequoia Records)
Tuatha Dea featuring Wendy Rule. Track: Aradia

References

External links
 

Living people
Australian Wiccans
Goth subculture
Australian women singers
1966 births
Performers of modern pagan music